This is a list of prefects of Bucharest.

See also 
 List of mayors of Bucharest

References 

 
Prefects
Prefects of Bucharest